Leif Tibell (born 16 November 1944) is a Swedish lichenologist and Emeritus Professor at the University of Uppsala. He is known for his expertise on calicioid lichens. He was awarded the Acharius Medal in 2012 for lifetime achievements in lichenology.

Biography
Tibell was born in Gothenburg, Sweden, in 1944. He developed an interest in lichens at a young age after meeting the prominent lichenologist Gunnar Degelius through the Gothenburg Botanical Garden, where they were both members. Degelius mentored Tibell, and recommended to him that he should study the subject at Uppsala University, which he did after moving there in the mid 1960s.

He continued with graduate studies under the supervision of Rolf Santesson after accompanying him on a research excursion to Norway's Varanger Peninsula in 1966. Santesson was Curator of the Herbarium at the Botany Department. He was also the father of Johan Santesson, who knew Tibell through an organic chemistry research group they were both part of. Rolf Santesson, who became Tibell's Ph.D. supervisor and second main mentor, suggested he should study genera of the family Caliciaceae – the pin lichens. Tibell followed his advice and ultimately developed a long career that was largely dedicated to the study of this group. After earning a Ph.D. in 1975, Tibell accepted a position at the Swedish Research Council that he held for many years. He was later promoted to Senior Lecturer and ultimately Professor in 2000. As of 2021, he is an Emeritus Professor with the Department of Organismal Biology at Uppsala University.

Recognition
Tibell was awarded the Acharius Medal in 2012. Swedish botanist Mats Wedin noted that another prominent Swedish lichenologist, Erik Acharius (for whom the medal is named), published one of the earliest taxonomic monographs in lichenology also on the subject of calicioid lichens. Tibell had a Festschrift dedicated to him in celebration of his 60th birthday in 2004.

Eponyms
Several taxa have been named in honour of Tibell. These include:
Leifidium  (1993); Tibellia  (1992); Atla tibelliorum  2016); Caloplaca tibellii  (2009); Chaenothecopsis leifiana  (2004); Chaenothecopsis tibellii  (2000); Chapsa tibellii  (2009); Choreospora tibellii  (1987); Dimerella tibellii ; Diorygma tibellii ; Hypotrachyna tibellii  (2009); Lecanactis tibelliana  (1994); Phaeocalicium tibellii  (1992); Plectocarpon tibellii ; Pronectria tibellii  (2004); Pyrgillus tibellii  (2012); Rinodina tibellii  (1983); Sphaerophorus tibellii  (1992); Xanthoparmelia tibellii  (2004); and Xanthoria tibellii  (2003).

Selected publications
Some of Tibell's major publications include:

See also
 :Category:Taxa named by Leif Tibell

References

1944 births
Living people
People from Gothenburg
Swedish lichenologists
Swedish taxonomists
Acharius Medal recipients
Uppsala University alumni
Academic staff of Uppsala University
20th-century Swedish scientists
21st-century Swedish scientists